The New Territories South East geographical constituency is one of the ten geographical constituencies in the elections for the Legislative Council of Hong Kong which elects two members of the Legislative Council using the single non-transferable vote (SNTV) system. The constituency covers Sai Kung District and Eastern part of Sha Tin District in New Territories.

History
The constituency was created under the overhaul of the electoral system imposed by the Beijing government in 2021, replacing the Sai Kung District and eastern part of Sha Tin District (Hoi Nam, Chung On, Kam To, Ma On Shan Town Centre, Wu Kai Sha, Lee On, Fu Lung, Kam Ying, Yiu On, Heng On, Tai Shui Hang, On Tai, Yu Yan, Kwong Hong, Kwong Yuen) of the New Territories East constituency used from 1998 to 2021. A constituency with the same name were also created for the 1995 Legislative Council election in the late colonial period which elected one seat with a similar boundary.

Returning members

Election results

2020s

References 

Constituencies of Hong Kong
New Territories
Constituencies of Hong Kong Legislative Council
2021 establishments in Hong Kong
Constituencies established in 2021